Cosmotomidius crudiaphilus is a species of beetle in the family Cerambycidae. It was described by Touroult et al. in 2010. It is known from French Guiana.

References

Pogonocherini
Beetles described in 2010